The Shi'ites Under Attack is a book written by Sh'ia Twelver Islamic scholar Muhammad Jawad Chirri, late founder and director of the Islamic Center of America.It contains answers to numerous accusations against beliefs and practices of Shia Muslims.Also, it includes discussions on the revelation of the Qur'an, Ibn Saba, and the companions of Prophet Muhammad.

References

External links
 Full text on Al-Islam.org.

Shia literature